Bobby Sandimanie (born July 8, 1975), better known by his stage name I-20, is an American rapper. He was originally known as Infamous 2-0 (on Ludacris's first two albums Incognegro and Back for the First Time), but changed his name to reflect the interstate route that runs through the Southeastern United States. He was discovered by Ludacris, who signed him to the Disturbing tha Peace record label. In 2002, he appeared on six songs from Disturbing Tha Peace's debut album Golden Grain ("Break Somethin'", "Smokin' Dro", "Can't Be Stopped (I Know)", "A-Town Hatz", "N.S.E.W." & "Outro On Ya Ass") and in 2004, I-20 released his debut album, Self Explanatory. It peaked at number 42 on the Billboard 200 and number five on the Top R&B/Hip-Hop Albums.

I-20 later appeared on Ludacris' seventh album Battle Of The Sexes (2010) on the song "B.O.T.S. Radio" alongside Shawnna. Since then, he has teamed up with Platinum selling producer DJ Pain 1 to release multiple projects.  He is managed by Mark "ShaH" Evans.

Personal life
Sandimanie's son, Bobby Sandimanie III, known professionally as Destroy Lonely, is a rapper signed to Playboi Carti's Opium label.

Discography
2004: Self Explanatory
TBA : Blood in the Water

Mixtapes 
2011: Interstate Trafficking (with DJ Noize)
2011: 20/20 Vision (with DJ Kurupt)
2011: The Grey Area (with DJ Bobby Black)
2012: Celebrity Rehab
2012: Celebrity Rehab 2
2013: The Amphetamine Manifesto: Part One
2013: The Amphetamine Manifesto: Part Two (Released 06/06/2013)

References

Living people
African-American male rappers
Def Jam Recordings artists
MNRK Music Group artists
Place of birth missing (living people)
People from Decatur, Georgia
Southern hip hop musicians
1975 births
21st-century American rappers
21st-century American male musicians
21st-century African-American musicians
20th-century African-American people